The 2013 Women's EuroHockey Championship III was the fifth edition of the Women's EuroHockey Championship III, the third level of the women's European field hockey championships organized by the European Hockey Federation. It was held in Athens, Greece alongside the Men's EuroHockey Championship IV from 21 to 26 July 2013.

Wales won its second EuroHockey Championship III title and were promoted to the 2015 EuroHockey Championship II together with the Czech Republic.

Results

Standings

Matches

See also
2013 Men's EuroHockey Championship III
2013 Women's EuroHockey Championship II

References

Women's EuroHockey Championship III
Women 3
EuroHockey Championship III
EuroHockey Championship III
Sports competitions in Athens
International women's field hockey competitions hosted by Greece
EuroHockey Championship III
2010s in Athens